Lahovo is a small settlement north of Nova Vas in the Municipality of Bloke in the Inner Carniola region of Slovenia.

References

External links

Lahovo on Geopedia

Populated places in the Municipality of Bloke